Mustapha Mrani (born 2 March 1978) is a Moroccan footballer who plays as a defender for MAS Fez. He was part of the Moroccan squad at the 2012 Africa Cup of Nations.

References

External links
Goal.com Profile

1978 births
Living people
Moroccan footballers
Morocco international footballers
2012 Africa Cup of Nations players
Association footballers not categorized by position